Harouna Pale (born 16 August 1957) is a Burkinabé sprinter. He competed in the men's 100 metres at the 1988 Summer Olympics.

References

External links
 

1957 births
Living people
Athletes (track and field) at the 1988 Summer Olympics
Athletes (track and field) at the 1992 Summer Olympics
Burkinabé male sprinters
Olympic athletes of Burkina Faso
World Athletics Championships athletes for Burkina Faso
Place of birth missing (living people)
21st-century Burkinabé people